Babesia motasi is a species belonging to Alveolata and the family Babesiidae. In sheep causes babesiosis disease, called "sheep babesiosis". Babesia motasi is quite big protozoa. Length 2,5-5 µm, usually pear-shaped. Is rare in erythrocytes.

Bibliography 
 
 

motasi